Sandro Gotal (born 9 September 1991) is an Austrian professional footballer of Croatian descent, who plays as a forward for Bayernliga Süd club SV Donaustauf.

Career
Gotal is considered a journeyman, and has played for 15 different teams in 9 different countries, including Sūduva in Lithuania, Dinamo Brest in Belarus, and Ashdod in Israel.

In September 2020, Gotal signed with fifth-tier Bayernliga Süd club SV Donaustauf after his contract had expired with Austrian club Hartberg.

Honours
Wolfsberger AC
 Erste Liga: 2011–12

Dinamo Brest
 Belarusian Cup: 2017–18
 Belarusian Super Cup: 2018

Sūduva
 A Lyga: 2018
 Lithuanian Supercup: 2019

References

External links
 
 
 

1991 births
Living people
Austrian footballers
SW Bregenz players
First Vienna FC players
Wolfsberger AC players
SK Austria Klagenfurt players
SV Horn players
HNK Hajduk Split players
FC St. Gallen players
Yeni Malatyaspor footballers
Piast Gliwice players
F.C. Ashdod players
NK Istra 1961 players
FC Dynamo Brest players
FK Sūduva Marijampolė players
TSV Hartberg players
Austrian Football Bundesliga players
Croatian Football League players
Ekstraklasa players
Israeli Premier League players
Austrian people of Croatian descent
Association football forwards
Austrian expatriate footballers
Expatriate footballers in Croatia
Expatriate footballers in Switzerland
Expatriate footballers in Turkey
Expatriate footballers in Poland
Expatriate footballers in Israel
Expatriate footballers in Belarus
Expatriate footballers in Lithuania
Expatriate footballers in Germany
Austrian expatriate sportspeople in Croatia
Austrian expatriate sportspeople in Switzerland
Austrian expatriate sportspeople in Turkey
Austrian expatriate sportspeople in Poland
Austrian expatriate sportspeople in Israel
Austrian expatriate sportspeople in Belarus
Austrian expatriate sportspeople in Lithuania
Austrian expatriate sportspeople in Germany
Bayernliga players
People from Bregenz
Footballers from Vorarlberg